The Collection is a three disc box set by Yanni, released on the Private Music label in 2006. The set contains three of Yanni's original album's on three discs. The albums included are In Celebration of Life, Dare to Dream, and In My Time.

Track listing
Disc 1: In Celebration of Life (1991)

Disc 2: Dare to Dream (1992)

Disc 3: In My Time (1993)

References

External links
Official Website

Yanni albums
2006 compilation albums